Karima Brittany Christmas-Kelly (born September 11, 1989) is an American basketball coach and former professional basketball player. Christmas-Kelly is currently an assistant coach for the Indiana Fever of the WNBA. She played college basketball at Duke.

Duke statistics
Source

WNBA

Christmas-Kelly was selected the second round of the 2011 WNBA Draft (23rd overall) by the Washington Mystics.

On February 5, 2015, Christmas signed with the Tulsa Shock, which she previously played from 2011 to 2012.

On February 1, 2019, Christmas-Kelly signed with the Minnesota Lynx. On July 30, 2020, Christmas-Kelly was waived by the Lynx after suffering a season-ending achilles injury.

WNBA career statistics

Regular season

|-
| align="left" | 2011
| align="left" | Washington
| 14 || 0 || 10.1 || .310 || .217 || .696 || 1.2 || 0.1 || 0.6 || 0.1 || 0.6 || 3.4
|-
| align="left" | 2011
| align="left" | Tulsa
| 17 || 0 || 9.8 || .370 || .235 || .800 || 1.2 || 0.4 || 0.4 || 0.2 || 0.9 || 3.2
|-
| align="left" | 2012
| align="left" | Tulsa
| 14 || 6 || 11.5 || .333 || .313 || .739 || 1.9 || 0.2 || 1.0 || 0.3 || 0.4 || 3.6
|-
|style="text-align:left;background:#afe6ba;"|  2012†
| align="left" | Indiana
| 16 || 0 || 10.9 || .314 || .318 || .500 || 2.3 || 0.8 || 0.8 || 0.3 || 0.5 || 2.9
|-
| align="left" | 2013
| align="left" | Indiana
| 34 || 28 || 26.9 || .373 || .300 || .811 || 4.1 || 1.1 || 1.9 || 0.3 || 1.2 || 8.6
|-
| align="left" | 2014
| align="left" | Indiana
| 34 || 3 || 21.6 || .343 || .386 || .755 || 3.6 || 0.9 || 0.9 || 0.3 || 0.7 || 6.9
|-
| align="left" | 2015
| align="left" | Tulsa
| 32 || 32 || 28.7 || .396 || .386 || .782 || 5.0 || 1.7 || 1.1 || 0.3 || 1.2 || 10.6
|-
| align="left" | 2016
| align="left" | Dallas
| 34 || 34 || 31.6 || .400 || .317 || .796 || 5.9 || 2.1 || 1.2 || 0.7 || 1.5 || 12.4
|-
| align="left" | 2017
| align="left" | Dallas
| 34 || 34 || 29.7 || .380 || .292 || .851 || 4.2 || 2.2 || 1.2 || 0.2 || 1.6 || 10.4
|-
| align="left" | 2018
| align="left" | Dallas
| 6 || 6 || 27.8 || .448 || .444 || .813 || 5.5 || 1.5 || 0.3 || 0.3 || 1.7 || 9.3
|-
| align="left" | 2019
| align="left" | Minnesota
| 6 || 0 || 12.0 || .278 || .273 || .600 || 0.8 || 1.0 || 0.8 || 0.2 || 0.7 || 2.7
|-
| align="left" | 2020
| align="left" | Minnesota
| 2 || 0 || 12.5 || .143 || .000 || .875 || 3.0 || 0.5 || 1.5 || 0.5 || 2.0 || 4.5
|-
| align="left" | Career
| align="left" | 10 years, 4 teams
| 243 || 143 || 22.9 || .374 || .321 || .791 || 3.7 || 1.3 || 1.1 || 0.3 || 1.1 || 7.0

Playoffs

|-
|style="text-align:left;background:#afe6ba;"|  2012†
| align="left" | Indiana
| 3 || 0 || 10.7 || .250 || .167 || 1.000 || 2.7 || 0.3 || 0.3 || 0.3 || 0.7 || 3.0
|-
| align="left" | 2013
| align="left" | Indiana
| 4 || 4 || 30.8 || .400 || .286 || .625 || 6.0 || 2.3 || 1.0 || 0.5 || 3.5 || 10.8
|-
| align="left" | 2014
| align="left" | Indiana
| 5 || 0 || 25.0 || .333 || .333 || .824 || 4.6 || 1.6 || 0.4 || 0.4 || 0.6 || 7.4
|-
| align="left" | 2015
| align="left" | Tulsa
| 2 || 2 || 32.5 || .211 || .000 || .875 || 5.0 || 1.0 || 1.5 || 0.5 || 1.5 || 7.5
|-
| align="left" | 2017
| align="left" | Dallas
| 1 || 1 || 34.0 || .222 || .000 || 1.000 || 5.0 || 3.0 || 1.0 || 1.0 || 0.0 || 6.0
|-
| align="left" | Career
| align="left" | 5 years, 2 teams
| 15 || 7 || 25.3 || .324 || .214 || .821 || 4.7 || 1.5 || 0.7 || 0.5 || 1.5 || 7.3

References

External links
Duke Blue Devils bio

1989 births
Living people
American women's basketball players
Basketball players from Long Beach, California
Dallas Wings players
Duke Blue Devils women's basketball players
Forwards (basketball)
Indiana Fever players
Indiana Fever coaches
Minnesota Lynx players
Parade High School All-Americans (girls' basketball)
Tulsa Shock players
Washington Mystics draft picks
Washington Mystics players